Roland Muzeau (born 5 November 1951 in La Garenne-Colombes) was a member of the National Assembly of France. He represented the first constituency of the Hauts-de-Seine department,  and is a member of the French Communist Party, which sits in the Assembly with the Democratic and Republican Left.

References

1951 births
Living people
People from La Garenne-Colombes
Politicians from Île-de-France
French Communist Party politicians
Deputies of the 13th National Assembly of the French Fifth Republic
French Senators of the Fifth Republic
Senators of Hauts-de-Seine